Masters W35 discus world record progression is the progression of world record improvements of the discus W35 division of Masters athletics.  Records must be set in properly conducted, official competitions under the standing IAAF rules unless modified by World Masters Athletics.

The W35 division consists of female athletes who have reached the age of 35 but have not yet reached the age of 40, so exactly from their 35th birthday to the day before their 40th birthday. The W35 division throws exactly the same 1 kg implement as the Open division.  These competitors all threw their records in open competition.

Key

References

Masters Athletics Discus list
All Time Athletics

Masters athletics world record progressions
Discus